(born February 19, 1993) is a Japanese professional wrestler currently signed to World Wonder Ring Stardom, where she is the leader of Stars. Since making her debut in January 2011, she became a two-time World of Stardom Champion, two-time Wonder of Stardom Champion, one-time High Speed Champion, one-time SWA World Champion, two-time Goddess of Stardom Champion, and a five-time Artist of Stardom Champion, while also having won the Cinderella Tournament back to back in 2015 and 2016, and the 2018 5*Grand Prix. She also made appearances for Stardom's American partner Ring of Honor (ROH), where she is a former one-time Women of Honor World Champion. Dave Meltzer of the Wrestling Observer Newsletter has called Iwatani and fellow Japanese workers Io Shirai and Kairi Hojo "three of the best wrestlers in the world".

Early life
Iwatani grew up in the countryside of Mine, Yamaguchi with her family, which includes two older brothers. In primary school, she practiced judo and high jump, but in high school, she began isolating herself from society, spending three years mostly indoors. After quitting high school, she fell in love with professional wrestling after seeing a Dragon Gate event. She contacted Fuka, the general manager of the World Wonder Ring Stardom promotion, who were looking for new wrestlers, and eventually moved to Tokyo in 2010 to pursue a career in professional wrestling.

Professional wrestling career

World Wonder Ring Stardom (2011–present)

2011–2017
Iwatani was part of Stardom's first class of trainees. She made her professional wrestling debut at the promotion's inaugural event on January 23, 2011, facing fellow debutante Arisa Hoshiki. Afterwards, Iwatani & Hoshiki formed a tag team named AMA, which became one of Stardom's most popular acts. Despite her popularity, Iwatani was the last of the class one trainees to obtain a win in a professional wrestling ring. In June, she was defeated by Eri Susa, the other winless Stardom trainee, and subsequently became known as Stardom's weakest wrestler. Iwatani was winless for the first eleven months of her career, before finally defeating Susa in a rematch on December 25, 2011. Afterwards, Iwatani & Hoshiki became part of Io Shirai's "Planet" stable, along with Natsumi Showzuki.

Following Hoshiki's retirement from professional wrestling in June 2012, Iwatani began teaming with Io Shirai under the team name "Thunder Rock". She also became part of a stable named Tawashis with Hiroyo Matsumoto & Miho Wakizawa. The three went on to win the Artist of Stardom Championship on December 29, 2013, by defeating Alpha Female, The Female Predator "Amazon" & Kyoko Kimura. On July 27, 2014, Iwatani won her first singles title, when she defeated her teammate Miho Wakizawa for the vacant Wonder of Stardom Championship. After a record-setting eight-month reign, Tawashis lost the Artist of Stardom Championship to Hatsuhinode Kamen, Kaori Yoneyama & Tsubasa Kuragaki on August 10, 2014. On January 18, 2015, Iwatani lost the Wonder of Stardom Championship to Act Yasukawa.

On April 23, 2015, Iwatani won the first annual Cinderella Tournament, defeating Koguma in the finals. As a result, Iwatani was granted a shot at Stardom's top title, the World of Stardom Championship, but was defeated by the defending champion, Kairi Hojo, on May 17. On May 6, Iwatani & Io Shirai, Thunder Rock, defeated Chelsea & Kairi Hojo to win the vacant Goddess of Stardom Championship. On October 11, Iwatani defeated Rosa Negra to also win the High Speed Championship. During their tag team title reign, Thunder Rock also won the 2015 Goddesses of Stardom Tag Tournament. On February 28, 2016, Iwatani became a triple champion, when she, Shirai & Kairi Hojo, billed together as "Threedom" (a combination of the words "Three" and "Stardom"), defeated Evie, Hiroyo Matsumoto & Kellie Skater for the Artist of Stardom Championship. In April, Iwatani, along with Hojo & Shirai, traveled to the United States to take part in events held by Lucha Underground and Vendetta Pro Wrestling. On April 29, Iwatani won her second Cinderella Tournament in a row, defeating Hiroyo Matsumoto in the finals. As a result, Iwatani received another shot at the World of Stardom Championship, but was defeated by Io Shirai on May 15. After setting records for both the longest reign and most successful title defenses, Iwatani & Shirai lost the Goddess of Stardom Championship to Kagetsu & Kyoko Kimura in their 11th title defense on June 16. On October 2, Threedom lost the Artist of Stardom Championship to Hana Kimura, Kagetsu & Kyoko Kimura in their third defense.

On November 11, both Thunder Rock and Threedom were dissolved, when Shirai turned on Iwatani, after the two had lost to Hojo & Yoko Bito in the finals of the 2016 Goddesses of Stardom Tag League. This led to Iwatani unsuccessfully challenging Shirai for the World of Stardom Championship at Stardom's year-end show on December 22. The following day, the match was named Stardom's 2016 Match of the Year. Reportedly, Iwatani was originally scheduled to win the match and the World of Stardom Championship, but the result was changed after she told Stardom that she wanted to retire from professional wrestling in 2017. After nine successful title defenses, Iwatani lost the High Speed Championship to Kris Wolf in a three-way match, also involving Kagetsu, on February 23, 2017. On April 30, Iwatani made it to the finals of her third Cinderella Tournament in a row, but was this time defeated by Toni Storm. With Storm going after the World of Stardom Championship, Iwatani chose to challenge for the Wonder of Stardom Championship. On May 14, Iwatani defeated Kairi Hojo to win the Wonder of Stardom Championship for the second time. Shortly afterwards, it was reported that Iwatani was no longer considering retirement and was being positioned as Stardom's top star in the wake of Io Shirai and Kairi Hojo's departures from the promotion.

On June 21, Iwatani defeated Shirai to win the World of Stardom Championship for the first time in her fifth challenge, becoming the first wrestler to simultaneously hold the World and Wonder of Stardom Championships. Afterwards, Iwatani started defending both the World and Wonder of Stardom Championships in separate title matches. On September 23, Iwatani lost the Wonder of Stardom Championship to Yoko Bito in her third defense. The following day, Iwatani lost the World of Stardom Championship to Storm, again in her third defense. The title change was unplanned as the match had to be stopped after only two minutes due to Iwatani legitimately dislocating her elbow, forcing referee Daichi Murayama to award the title to Storm. Iwatani returned to the ring on December 10 to take part in Yoko Bito's final match in Shin-Kiba 1st Ring.

2018
Since her return, Iwatani became the leader of a new unit named "Stars" (initially Stardom's Army). On February 18, 2018, Iwatani & Tam Nakano challenged Oedo Tai (Hana Kimura & Kagetsu) for the Goddesses of Stardom Championship but were unsuccessful. On April 1, Iwatani tried to capture again the World of Stardom Championship from Toni Storm after Iwatani was injured in their last match, but was unsuccessful. On June 3, Iwatani, along with Saki Kashima, defeated Hana Kimura & Kagetsu to win the Goddesses of Stardom Championship. On September 24, Iwatani won the 5★Star GP after defeating Utami Hayashishita in the finals. On September 30, at the afternoon show of 5★Star Grand Champion Carnival, Iwatani won the Artist of Stardom Championship with Kashima & Nakano after defeating J.A.N. (Jungle Kyona, Kaori Yoneyama & Natsuko Tora), however, Iwatani & Kashima lost the Goddess of Stardom Championship to Kyona & Tora during the evening show.

2019
On May 16, 2019, Stars (Iwatani, Tam Nakano & Saki Kashima) lost the Artist of Stardom Championship to Tokyo Cyber Squad (Hana Kimura, Jungle Kyona & Konami). Stars won the title for the second time on June 23, after defeating Tokyo Cyber Squad. Stars held the title until July 20, when they lost the championship to Andras Miyagi, Kagetsu & Sumire Natsu. On November 4, 2019, Iwatani defeated Bea Priestley to win the World of Stardom Championship for the second time.

2020
At Stardom Cinderella Tournament 2020, Iwatani wrestled Hana Kimura into a time-limit draw during the first-round matches from March 24. At Stardom Yokohama Cinderella 2020 on October 3, 2020, she successfully defended the World of Stardom Championship against Syuri. On November 15, 2020, Iwatani lost the World Championship to Utami Hayashishita, ending her reign at 377 days. At Stardom Osaka Dream Cinderella 2020 on December 20, Iwatani teamed up with Stars stablemates Starlight Kid & Gokigen Death and unsuccessfully challenged the then sub-unit of Stars, Cosmic Angels (Mina Shirakawa, Tam Nakano & Unagi Sayaka) for the Artist of Stardom Championship. After they retained the title, Sayaka, Nakano & Shirakawa announced that they would split up from Stars to act as an independent unit.

2021
At Stardom 10th Anniversary Show on January 17, 2021, Iwatani teamed up with Ruaka in a Four-Way Elimination Tag Team Match won by Queen's Quest (Momo Watanabe & Saya Kamitani) and also involving the teams of Donna Del Mondo (Syuri & Himeka) and Oedo Tai (Bea Priestley & Saki Kashima). At Stardom All Star Dream Cinderella on March 3, 2021, she defeated Yoshiko. The unit of Stars leaded by Iwatani began losing members in 2021, beginning with Ruaka who defected to Oedo Tai on February 20. At Stardom Yokohama Dream Cinderella 2021, she continued losing members, as she teamed up with Starlight Kid, Saya Iida, Hanan & Fukigen Death, falling short to Oedo Tai's Natsuko Tora, Konami, Saki Kashima, Ruaka & Rina in a Ten-Woman Elimination Tag Team Match. Since she was eliminated last, Death was forced to join the enemy unit. The stable's fall continued at the last night of the Stardom Cinderella Tournament 2021 from June 12, where Iwatani lost Starlight Kid to Oedo Tai the same way as with Gokigen Death. Iwatani had also compete in the main tournament, making it into the quarterfinals from May 14 where she fell short to Himeka. Koguma returned to professional wrestling after a long absence and joined Stars. Iwatani teamed up with her at Yokohama Dream Cinderella 2021 in Summer on July 4, 2021, where they unsuccessfully challenged Syuri & Giulia for the Goddess of Stardom Championship. At Stardom 5 Star Grand Prix 2021, Iwatani fought in the "Red Stars" block and scored a total of eleven points after competing against Momo Watanabe, Koguma, Starlight Kid, Himeka, Fukigen Death, Natsupoi, Giulia, Mina Shirakawa, and Saki Kashima. At Stardom 10th Anniversary Grand Final Osaka Dream Cinderella on October 9, 2021, she unsuccessfully challenged Tam Nakano for the Wonder of Stardom Championship as the match went into a time-limit draw. At the 2021 edition of the Goddesses of Stardom Tag League, Iwatani teamed up with Rin Kadokura as "Blue MaRine" and fought in the "Blue Goddess" block where thet scored a total of seven points after competing against the teams of MOMOAZ (Momo Watanabe & AZM), Kurotora Kaidou (Starlight Kid & Ruaka), Ponytail and Samurai Road (Syuri & Maika), Dream H (Tam Nakano & Mina Shirakawa) and C Moon (Lady C & Waka Tsukiyama). At Kawasaki Super Wars, the first event of the Stardom Super Wars trilogy which took place on November 3, 2021, Iwatani teamed up with Koguma and went into a time-limit draw against Himeka & Natsupoi. At Tokyo Super Wars on November 27, she teamed up with Hazuki & Hanan to defeat Oedo Tai (Saki Kashima, Fukigen Death & Rina). At Osaka Super Wars, the final event of the trilogy from December 18, Iwatani teamed up with Hazuki & Koguma and took part in a ¥10 Million Unit Tournament which was also contested for the Artist of Stardom Championship by first defeating Cosmic Angels (Tam Nakano, Mina Shirakawa & Unagi Sayaka) in the semi finals, and eventually falling short to the champions MaiHimePoi (Maika, Natsupoi & Himeka) in the finals on the same night as a result of a Six-Woman Tag Team ladder match. At Stardom Dream Queendom on December 29, 2021, Iwatani teamed up with Takumi Iroha to defeat Hazuki and Momo Watanabe.

2022
At Stardom Nagoya Supreme Fight on January 29, 2022, Iwatani went into a time-limit draw against Giulia in a World of Stardom Championship #1 Contender's Match. At Stardom Cinderella Journey on February 23, 2022, she teamed up with Tam Nakano to defeat Fukigen Death & Saki Kashima. On the first night of the Stardom World Climax 2022 from March 26, Iwatani teamed up with Kairi to defeat Tam Nakano & Unagi Sayaka. On the second night from March 27, she unsuccessfully challenged Syuri for the World of Stardom Championship. At the Stardom Cinderella Tournament 2022, she made it to the second round matches from April 10 where she fell short to Saki Kashima. At Stardom Golden Week Fight Tour on May 5, 2022, Iwatani defeated Thekla to win the SWA World Championship. She officially became the second woman to win all the eligible titles in Stardom after Io Shirai, thus becoming the second ever "grand slam champion". At Stardom Flashing Champions on May 28, 2022, she successfully defended the SWA title against Fukigen Death. At Stardom Fight in the Top on June 26, 2022, Iwatani teamed up with Hazuki & Koguma and defeated Queen's Quest's Utami Hayashishita, Saya Kamitani & AZM in a Six-Woman Tag Team Steel Cage Match. At Mid Summer Champions in Tokyo, the first event of the Stardom Mid Summer Champions series which took place on July 9, 2022, Iwatani teamed up with Hazuki, Koguma & Saya Iida in a losing effort against Saki Kashima, Ruaka, Rina & Fukigen Death.  At Mid Summer Champions in Nagoya on July 24, she teamed up with Momo Kohgo and defeated Ruaka & Fukigen Death. At the Stardom 5 Star Grand Prix 2022, Iwatani fought in the "Blue Stars" block where she scored a total of fifteen points after competing against Giulia, Mirai, Suzu Suzuki, Hazuki, Saya Kamitani, Starlight Kid, Natsupoi, Momo Watanabe, Ami Sourei, Mina Shirakawa, Saya Iida, and Hanan. At Stardom in Showcase vol.1, Iwatani competed in a Nagoya Rumble Match won by Kaori Yoneyama who appeared with her old Stars gimmick of "Gokigen Death". At Stardom x Stardom: Nagoya Midsummer Encounter on August 21, 2022, she teamed up with Saya Iida & Momo Kohgo in a losing effort against Utami Hayashishita, AZM & Lady C. At Stardom in Showcase vol.2 on September 25, 2022, she competed in a four-way match won by AZM and also involving Ram Kaicho and Maika. Iwatani became a participant in a tournament to become the inaugural IWGP Women's Champion. In the first round of the tournament, she defeated Odeo Tai's Momo Watanabe on October 22. At Goddesses of Stardom Tag League 2022 Night 1 on October 23, 2022, Iwatani defeated Utami Hayashishita in a semi-final match of the tournament. After the match, Iwatani stare down at her opponent whom she will be facing in the finals at Historic X-Over, Kairi as both women got a hold of the IWGP Women's Championship belt in the middle of the ring. At Hiroshima Goddess Festival on November 3, 2022, she defeated Alpha Female to retain the SWA World Championship. After the match, Iwatani relinquished the title to concentrate on the IWGP Women's Championship match from Historic X-Over on November 20, 2022. Iwatani failed to win the championship at Historic X-Over after losing to Kairi.

New Japan Pro-Wrestling (2020, 2021, 2022)
On January 4, 2020, Mayu along with Arisa Hoshiki, Giulia and Hana Kimura made their debut in New Japan Pro-Wrestling at Wrestle Kingdom 14 in Tokyo Dome in a special Stardom tag team exhibition match. Iwatani continued to work in these kinds of matches, making her next appearance at Wrestle Kingdom 15 on January 5, 2021, where she teamed up with Tam Nakano and fell short to Donna Del Mondo's Syuri and Giulia. At Wrestle Kingdom 16 on January 5, 2022, she teamed up with Starlight Kid and fell short to Tam Nakano and Saya Kamitani.

Ring of Honor (2017–2019) 
On December 15, Iwatani made her debut for American promotion Ring of Honor (ROH), when she was announced as part of a tournament to crown the inaugural Women of Honor Champion. At Bound By Honor, Iwatani challenged champion Kelly Klein to a title match, in which she defeated Klein for the title. Iwatani successfully defended the title twice before losing the title back to Klein at the G1 Supercard on April 6, 2019.

Championships and accomplishments
Pro Wrestling Illustrated
Ranked No. 9 of the top 50 female singles wrestlers in the PWI Female 50 in 2018
Ranked No. 16 of the top 100 female singles wrestlers in the PWI Women's 100 in 2019
Ranked No. 10 of the top 100 female wrestlers in the PWI Female 100 in 2020
Ranked No. 65 of the top 150 female singles wrestlers in the PWI Women's 150 in 2021
Ranked No. 27 of the top 150 female singles wrestlers in the PWI Women's 150 in 2022
Ring of Honor
Women of Honor World Championship (1 time)
Tokyo Sports
Joshi Puroresu Grand Prize (2019)
World Wonder Ring Stardom
Artist of Stardom Championship (5 times) – with Hiroyo Matsumoto & Miho Wakizawa (1), Io Shirai & Takumi Iroha (1), Io Shirai & Kairi Hojo (1), and Saki Kashima & Tam Nakano (2)
Goddess of Stardom Championship (2 times) – with Io Shirai (1) and Saki Kashima (1)
High Speed Championship (1 time)
Wonder of Stardom Championship (2 times)
Wonder of Stardom Championship tournament (2014)
World of Stardom Championship (2 times)
SWA World Championship (1 time)
 Second Grand Slam Champion
Cinderella Tournament (2015, 2016)
Goddess of Stardom Championship Tournament (2015)– with Io Shirai
Goddesses of Stardom Tag League (2015) – with Io Shirai
Moneyball Tournament (2022) – with Hazuki and Koguma
5★Star GP (2018)
5★Star GP Award (4 times)
5★Star GP Best Match Award (2015) vs. Io Shirai on August 23
5★Star GP Best Match Award (2017) vs. Kagetsu on September 18
5★Star GP Red Stars Best Bout Award (2021) vs Giulia on August 1
5★Star GP Outstanding Performance Award (2014)
Stardom Year-End Award (10 times)
Best Match Award (2016) vs. Io Shirai on December 22
Best Match Award (2018) with Io Shirai vs. Kagetsu and Hazuki on June 17
Best Match Award (2020) 
Best Tag Team Award (2015) with Io Shirai
Best Technique Award (2014, 2015)
Best Unit Award (2022) 
Fighting Spirit Award (2017)
MVP Award (2019)
Special Award (2021)

References

External links 

 Official blog
 World Wonder Ring Stardom profile 
 
 

1993 births
Living people
Japanese female professional wrestlers
Sportspeople from Yamaguchi Prefecture
Masked wrestlers
21st-century professional wrestlers
World of Stardom Champions
Wonder of Stardom Champions
Goddess of Stardom Champions
Artist of Stardom Champions
High Speed Champions
SWA World Champions
Women of Honor World Champions